Korean claim to Tsushima Island concerns a territorial issue over Tsushima (対馬), a large island in the Korea Strait between the Korean peninsula and the island of Kyushu. The island, which is known as the Daemado in Korean, has been controlled by Japan since at least the 8th century, but some historic Korean governments have claimed that the island is rightfully Korean territory. Some have also taken unofficial steps to attempt to assert a potential Korean claim in modern times, even though the island is currently not officially claimed in any way by either South Korea or North Korea.

History
Sanguozhi, the official historical records of the Three Kingdoms period of China (220–280 A.D.) written in the third century, recorded that the island was an ancient country of Wa (Japan). Similarly the samguk sagi states that Japan ruled the island since CE 400.

When the ancient law system Ritsuryō of Japan was established (somewhere between 645 and 701 A.D.), Tsushima Province formally became a province of Japan. Since then, Tsushima Province has been a part of Japan, except for the temporary occupation by the Mongol Empire during the Mongol invasions of Japan (1274 and 1281).

Though the royal court of Joseon Dynasty Korea (1392-1897) recognized that the island was inhabited and controlled by Japanese, it generally maintained that the island had been Korean territory since ancient times, and that despite the lengthy Japanese occupation of the island it fundamentally rightfully belonged to Korea. The Sō samurai household, loyal vassals of each successive Japanese shogunate who acted as governors or lords of Tsushima since the 12th century, were also claimed as vassals by the kings of Joseon and consistently behaved accordingly.

The island was described by Hayashi Shihei in Sangoku Tsūran Zusetsu, which was  published in 1785. As in many Japanese publications of the time, it was identified as part of Japan.

20th century
In 1946, the Supreme Commander for the Allied Powers (SCAP) defined Japan to include the four main islands and approximately 1000 nearby islands, including Tsushima.

In 1948, the Republic of Korea (ROK) asserted its sovereignty over the island based on "historical claims".
In 1949, the SCAP rejected South Korea's claim.

In 1951, United States-Korea negotiations about the Treaty of San Francisco made no mention of Tsushima Island.  After this, the status of Tsushima as an island of Japan was re-confirmed by the US.

In 1974, Korea and Japan reaffirmed that Tsushima is part of Japan.

21st century
In 2008, a small minority of members of the National Assembly of South Korea proposed claiming Tsushima as part of Korea. There were 50 members in this group.

In 2010, some members of the National Assembly proposed a study of Korea's territorial claims to Tsushima.  There were 37 members in this group.

In 2013, a South Korean court decided the preliminary injunction that provisionally prevented a Buddhist statue stolen from a temple in Tsushima to South Korea from returning to the temple. A document found in the Buddhist statue showed that the statue was made in a Korean temple Buseoksa in 1330. Based on this record, some Koreans assume that the statue was moved illegally from Korea to Japan by Wokou in the late 14th century. Additionally, Buseoksa declared its ownership over the statue. This news provoked another wave of anger amongst the islanders and throughout much of Japan, as it was assumed that this could be a sign of Korean territorial ambitions.

Timeline
 1946: SCAP lists Tsushima as part of Japan
 1950: Korea claims the island
 1951: South Korea sets aside claim to Tsushima
 1974: South Korea-Japan treaty reconfirms Tsushima is Japanese island
 2005: South Korean city Changwon City claims the island as South Korean territory.
 2008: 50 members of ROK National Assembly propose re-claiming Tsushima
 2010: 37 members of ROK National assembly propose study about re-claiming the island

United States' position
A 1950 United States' report titled Korea's Recent Claim to the Island of Tsushima analyzed the Korean claim and says:

References

External links

  The Territorial Dispute Over Dokdo

Japan–Korea relations